The 1969 North Indian Ocean cyclone season was an active cyclone season. The season has no official bounds but cyclones in the northern Indian Ocean tend to form between April and December. There are two main seas in the North Indian Ocean—the Bay of Bengal to the east of the Indian subcontinent and the Arabian Sea to the west of India. The official Regional Specialized Meteorological Centre in this basin is the India Meteorological Department (IMD), while the Joint Typhoon Warning Center releases unofficial advisories. An average of four to six storms form in the North Indian Ocean every season with peaks in May and November. Cyclones occurring between the meridians 45°E and 100°E are included in the season by the IMD.


Seasonal summary

Systems

Cyclonic Storm One

A low-pressure area on the Bay of Bengal intensified to a depression on May 14. Moving west-northwest, it further strengthened to a deep depression on the next day, with ships in the area reporting below gale-force winds and a cyclonic storm on May 16. ESSA-8 satellite imageries reported that the storm has winds equivalent to a Category 2 storm at that time, before crossing the coast between Ongole and Masulipatam (now Machilipatnam) on the next day, maintaining its intensity. Inland, it rapidly weakened to a depression and an area of low-pressure on May 19 and 20, respectively. 

Heavy rains and gusty winds were reported on the northern parts of Andhra Pradesh, causing widespread destruction and unprecedented floods. Over 600 individuals and a few lakh heads of cattle were rendered dead as a result of the storm, while many croplands were destroyed. Total loss was estimated to be at a hundred crores of rupees.

Depression Two

A trough of low-pressure was first located over the east-central portion of Arabian Sea, off Mysore and southern coasts of Maharastra. It further extended and moved northwards before becoming well-marked by June 3. On the next day, a depression formed from this feature near south Gujarat and north Maharastra coasts, two days later. It subsequently weakened to a low-pressure area that day.

Under the influence of the system, the monsoon advanced on the Arabian Sea, particularly on Maharastra and south Gujarat coasts from June 67.

Depression Three

A cyclonic circulation formed over the Bay of Bengal on June 15. This feature spawned a low-pressure area on the basin which intensified to a depression on the evening of the next day. Its wind speeds were equivalent of a modern-day deep depression; however, the IMD treated the system a depression, as such. Later, it slowed down as it moved northwards before taking a northwesterly turn as it accelerated towards East Pakistan (now Bangladesh). On July 20 in the night, it made landfall on the country near Chittagong before rapidly weakening to a low-pressure area and merging with the seasonal trough over Assam. 

Widespread rainfall were reported on Assam on July 20 as a result of the system.

Deep Depression Four

After a month-long inactivity over the basin, a low-pressure area developed over the northwest portion of the Bay of Bengal on July 26. It became well-marked by that evening and a depression on July 28. Moving northwestward, it further became a deep depression on the next day, with Sandheads recording a minimum pressure of  that day. ESSA-8 satellite imagery on July 29 depicted that the bands of the system located on all of its peripheries. Before the afternoon of the next day, it moved over Balasore while continuing its movement before weakening to a depression over Ambikapur, Chhattisgarh that evening. It shifted its movement towards the west on July 31 before degrading further to a low-pressure area over Madhya Pradesh on the first day of August.

Under the storm's influence, the monsoon further became active in eastern Madhya Pradesh and Orissa (now Odisha). According to press reports, these rains caused flooding on many districts in Orissa, Madhya Pradesh and Jagdalpur. Villages in these areas and near rivers were inundated and traffics were affected.

Depression Five

An area of low-pressure formed in the Bay of Bengal on August 7. It became well-marked that evening and further strengthened to a depression on the next day. Moving northwest, the system crossed the coast over Sundarbans before rapidly weakening back to a low-pressure area that day. It then moved over Uttar Pradesh on August 12, where it was last noted.

The system caused an active monsoon condition in Orissa and the Gangetic West Bengal on August 8-10.

Cyclonic Storm Six 

An upper air cyclonic circulation formed over East Pakistan and the adjoining Bay of Bengal on August 12 in the morning. A low-pressure area subsequently developed on that evening before strengthening to a depression on the next day. Meteorological analysis revealed that there was a fall in pressure at that time inland the Gangetic West Bengal and Orissa. While moving west-northwestwards, it rapidly intensified to a cyclonic storm near Chuksar Island, or south-southwest of Sagar Island. Continuing its course, it crossed north Orissa near Balasore that night before weakening to a deep depression, about 100 kilometres to the south of Jamshedpur. As it changed its movement towards the northwest, it further weakened to a depression before degenerating to an area of low-pressure over northwest Madhya Pradesh and the adjoining southwest Uttar Pradesh on August 16 in the evening.

The influence of the cyclone caused active monsoon conditions on Gangetic West Bengal, Bihar, eastern Madhya Pradesh, Orissa and east Rajasthan from August 13-17. Meanwhile, as east Rajashthan was impacted by these rains, particularly the districts of Chittorgarh and Jhalawar, it caused flooding that caused road communication problems.

Depression Seven 

After almost another month of no activity on the basin, an east-west trough located over north Indian peninsula and a well-marked trough line over 17.0 N spawned a cyclonic circulation on September 4. A low-pressure area formed from this feature on that day before strengthening to a depression, two days later. Moving to the northwest, the storm didn't strengthen much and crossed Orissa near Gopalpur on September 7 in the morning. Despite tracking inland, a 09:13 IST ESSA-8 satellite imagery revealed a cyclonic circulation over Gujarat. Later moving in a north-northeast movement after tracking west-northwestwards and northwards, it weakened further to an area of low-pressure on September 11 before merging into the seasonal trough on the evening of the next day.

In association with the troughs, the monsoon further advanced through Haryana, Maharastra, Gujarat, Punjab, Uttar Pradesh, western Madhya Pradesh, Orissa, the coastal areas of Andhra Pradesh, Bihar Plateau and the Gangetic West Bengal from September 5-13.

Depression Eight

Deep Depression Nine

Cyclonic Storm Ten

Cyclonic Storm Eleven

Severe Cyclonic Storm Twelve 

Storms in May and November struck Andhra Pradesh, killing 858 people.

Depression Thirteen

Deep Depression Fourteen

See also

 North Indian Ocean tropical cyclone
 List of tropical cyclone records
 1969 Atlantic hurricane season
 1969 Pacific hurricane season
 1969 Pacific typhoon season
 Australian cyclone seasons: 1969–70
 South Pacific cyclone seasons: 1969–70
 South-West Indian Ocean cyclone seasons: 1969–70

References

External links

India Meteorological Department
Joint Typhoon Warning Center 

 
Tropical cyclones in India
1969 in India